Puka Rumi (Quechua puka red, rumi stone, "red stone", Hispanicized spelling Puca Rumi) is a  mountain in the Andes of Peru. It is located in the Junín Region, Yauli Province, Marcapomacocha District. It lies northwest of Chunta and Kashpi.

References

Mountains of Peru
Mountains of Junín Region